Ripley Township is one of nine townships in Brown County, Illinois, USA.  As of the 2020 census, its population was 70 and it contained 44 housing units.

Geography

Cities
 Ripley (vast majority)

Cemeteries
The township contains Ripley Township Cemetery.

Major highways
  US Route 24

Demographics
As of the 2020 census there were 70 people, 27 households, and 17 families residing in the township. The racial makeup of the township was 95.71% White, 0.00% African American, 0.00% Native American, 0.00% Asian, 0.00% Pacific Islander, 0.00% from other races, and 4.29% from two or more races. Hispanic or Latino of any race were 2.86% of the population.

There were 27 households, out of which 14.80% had children under the age of 18 living with them, 55.56% were married couples living together, 7.41% had a female householder with no spouse present, and 37.04% were non-families. 37.00% of all households were made up of individuals, and 29.60% had someone living alone who was 65 years of age or older. The average household size was 1.78 and the average family size was 2.24.

The township's age distribution consisted of 12.5% under the age of 18, none from 18 to 24, 14.6% from 25 to 44, 27.1% from 45 to 64, and 45.8% who were 65 years of age or older. The median age was 64.3 years. For every 100 females, there were 100.0 males. For every 100 females age 18 and over, there were 110.0 males.

The median income for a household in the township was $26,250. Males had a median income of $38,750 versus $30,625 for females. The per capita income for the township was $18,996. About 11.8% of families and 12.5% of the population were below the poverty line, including 33.3% of those under age 18 and 9.1% of those age 65 or over.

School districts
 Brown County Community Unit School District 1

Political districts
 Illinois' 18th congressional district
 State House District 93
 State Senate District 47

References
 
 United States Census Bureau 2007 TIGER/Line Shapefiles
 United States National Atlas

External links
 City-Data.com
 Illinois State Archives

Townships in Brown County, Illinois
Populated places established in 1853
Townships in Illinois
1853 establishments in Illinois